Gunnera is the sole genus of herbaceous flowering plants in the family Gunneraceae, which contains 63 species. Some species in this genus, namely those in the subgenus Panke, have extremely large leaves. Species in the genus are variously native to Latin America,  Australia, New Zealand, Papuasia, Hawaii, insular Southeast Asia, Africa, and Madagascar. The stalks of many species are edible.

Taxonomy 
Gunnera is the only genus in the family Gunneraceae. The APG II system, of 2003, also recognizes this family and assigns it to the order Gunnerales in the clade core eudicots. The family then consisted of one or two genera, Gunnera and, optionally, Myrothamnus, the latter optionally segregated as a separate family, Myrothamnaceae. This represents a change from the APG system, of 1998, which firmly recognized two separate families, unplaced as to order. The APG III system and APG IV system recognizes the family Gunneraceae and places Myrothamnus in Myrothamnaceae; both families are placed in the order Gunnerales in the core eudicots.

The genus Gunnera was named after the Norwegian botanist Johann Ernst Gunnerus. At first it was assigned to the family Haloragaceae, though that presented difficulties that led to the general recognition of the family Gunneraceae, as had been proposed about the beginning of the 20th century. In the meantime, in many publications it had been referred to as being in the Haloragaceae, variously misspelt (as for example "Halorrhagidaceae".) Such references still cause difficulties in consulting earlier works. However, currently Gunnera is firmly assigned to the monogeneric family Gunneraceae.

Evolution 
Gunnera is thought to be a rather ancient group, with a well-documented fossil history due to the presence of fossilized pollen spores, known by the palynotaxon Tricolpites reticulatus. It is a Gondwanan lineage, having originated in South America during the Cretaceous. The earliest fossilized pollen is known from the Late Cretaceous (Turonian) of Peru, about 90 million years ago, and within the following 10 million years, Gunnera had achieved a worldwide distribution, with fossil pollen grains being found in areas where it is not found today, such as western North America, mainland Australia, and Antarctica. Based on fossil pollen recovered from drilling cores, Gunnera is also known to have inhabited the now-submerged islands of the Ninetyeast Ridge during the Paleocene, likely having dispersed there from either Australasia or the then-emergent Kerguelen Plateau islands.

Due to the widespread distribution of Gunnera during the Cretaceous, it was previously thought that the modern disjunct distribution of the genus was a relic of this period. However, phylogenetic analysis indicates that the majority of Gunnera species, even those found on entirely different continents, diverged from each other during the Cenozoic, indicating that the modern distribution of Gunnera is a consequence of long-distance dispersal from South America to other parts of the world, rather than relics of a former cosmopolitan distribution. The only species that diverged prior to the Cenozoic is Gunnera herteri of southeastern Brazil, which is thought to be the most ancient species of the genus, its lineage having diverged during the Late Cretaceous, roughly concurrent with the oldest Gunnera fossil pollen from Peru. The persistence of the Gunnera crown group since the Cretaceous makes it unique among flowering plants, and may have been facilitated by strong niche conservatism, dispersal ability, and being able to aggressively colonize disturbed land.

Description
The 40–50 species vary enormously in leaf size, with the iconic large-leaved species belonging to the subgenus Panke. The width of the leaf blade is typically , but on two occasions cultivated specimens (in Dorset, England in 2011 and at Narrowwater, Ulster, Ireland in 1903) produced leaves fully  in width. The seeds germinate best in very moist, but not wet, conditions and temperatures of 22–29 °C.

Only slightly smaller is G. masafuerae of the Juan Fernandez Islands off the Chilean coast. These leafstalks or petioles are the thickest of any dicot, and probably also the most massive. The flowers of Gunnera species are dimerous ( two sepals, two petals (or none) . two stamens (or one), and two carpels. Other giant Gunnera species within the subgenus Panke are found throughout the Neotropics and Hawaii. Gunnera insignis is also known by the name "poor man's umbrella" in Costa Rica.

Outside of the subgenus Panke, most of the more basal Gunnera species have small-to-medium-sized leaves. There are some species with moderately large leaves in Africa (G. perpensa, in the subgenus Perpensum) and Southeast Asia (G. macrophylla, in the subgenus Pseudogunnera), but the majority of more basal species are low-lying, mat-forming plants with small leaves. There are several small species are found in New Zealand, notably G. albocarpa, with leaves only 1–2 cm long, and also in South America, with G. magellanica having leaves 5–9 cm wide on stalks 8–15 cm long. The most basal species in the genus, G. herteri of Brazil, also has small leaves.

Some fossil leaf impressions of Gunnera from the Cretaceous of North America have large leaves akin to those of Panke, and the most basal extant species within Panke (G. mexicana) is the most northern member. For this reason, it has been suggested that Panke originates from South American Gunnera that colonized North America during the Cretaceous and grew into giant forms, with the remaining South American Gunnera evolving into the subgenus Misandra, with a low-lying, matlike growth. During the Cenozoic, the North American Panke would have colonized Hawaii and retreated southwards on the mainland before recolonizing South America. However, more recent phylogenetic evidence suggests that Misandra and Panke diverged only 15 million years ago, much too recent to assign the Cretaceous Gunnera to Panke. Due to this, the large-leaved Cretaceous Gunnera from North America may represent a distinct lineage that convergently evolved giant leaves similar to those of Panke, but did not leave any descendants.

Species
Species list adapted from the World Checklist of Selected Plant Families;

 Gunnera aequatoriensis - Ecuador
 Gunnera albocarpa - New Zealand
 Gunnera annae - Peru, Bolivia
 Gunnera antioquensis L.E.Mora - Colombia
 Gunnera apiculata - Bolivia, Argentina
 Gunnera arenaria - New Zealand
 Gunnera atropurpurea - Colombia, Ecuador
 Gunnera berteroi - Bolivia, Argentina, Chile
 Gunnera bogotana  - Colombia
 Gunnera bolivari - Peru, Ecuador
 Gunnera bracteata - Robinson Crusoe Island in Chile
 Gunnera brephogea - Colombia, Ecuador, Peru
 Gunnera caucana - Colombia
 Gunnera colombiana - Colombia, Ecuador
 Gunnera cordifolia - Tasmania
 Gunnera cuatrecasasii - Colombia
 Gunnera densiflora - New Zealand
 Gunnera dentata - New Zealand
 Gunnera diazii - Colombia
 Gunnera flavida - New Zealand
 Gunnera garciae-barrigae - Colombia
 Gunnera hamiltonii - New Zealand
 Gunnera hernandezii - Colombia
 Gunnera herteri Osten - Uruguay, S Brazil
 Gunnera insignis  - Panama, Nicaragua, Costa Rica
 Gunnera kauaiensis - Kauai in Hawaii
 Gunnera killipiana  - Chiapas, Guatemala, Honduras
 Gunnera lobata - Tierra del Fuego
 Gunnera lozanoi - Colombia
 Gunnera macrophylla - Papuasia, Indonesia, Philippines
 Gunnera magellanica - W + S South America, Falkland Is.
 Gunnera magnifica - Colombia
 Gunnera manicata - S Brazil
 Gunnera margaretae - Peru, Bolivia
 Gunnera masafuerae - Alejandro Selkirk Island (Isla Mas Afuera) in Chile
 Gunnera mexicana - Veracruz, Chiapas
 Gunnera mixta - New Zealand
 Gunnera monoica - New Zealand incl Chatham Islands
 Gunnera morae - Colombia
 Gunnera peltata - Robinson Crusoe Island in Chile
 Gunnera perpensa - Africa, Madagascar
 Gunnera peruviana  - Ecuador, Peru
 Gunnera petaloidea - Hawaii
 Gunnera pilosa - Peru, Bolivia, Ecuador
 Gunnera pittieriana  - Venezuela
 Gunnera prorepens- New Zealand
 Gunnera quitoensis - Ecuador
 Gunnera reniformis -  New Guinea
 Gunnera saint-johnii - Colombia
 Gunnera sanctae-marthae - Colombia
 Gunnera schindleri - Bolivia, Argentina
 Gunnera schultesii - Colombia
 Gunnera silvioana - Ecuador, Colombia
 Gunnera steyermarkii - Venezuela
 Gunnera strigosa- New Zealand
 Gunnera tacueyana - Colombia
 Gunnera tajumbina - Ecuador, Colombia
 Gunnera talamancana - Costa Rica, Panama
 Gunnera tamanensis - Colombia
 Gunnera tayrona - Colombia
 Gunnera tinctoria - Chile, Argentina
 Gunnera venezolana - Venezuela

Cyanobacterial symbiosis
At least some species of Gunnera host endosymbiotic cyanobacteria such as Nostoc punctiforme. The cyanobacteria provide fixed nitrogen to the plant, while the plant provides fixed carbon to the microbe. The bacteria enter the plant via glands found at the base of each leaf stalk and initiate an intracellular symbiosis which is thought to provide the plant with fixed nitrogen in return for fixed carbon for the bacterium. This intracellular interaction is unique in flowering plants and may provide insights to allow the creation of novel symbioses between crop plants and cyanobacteria, allowing growth in areas lacking fixed nitrogen in the soil.

Uses
The stalks of G. tinctoria (nalcas), from southern Chile and Argentina, are edible. Their principal use is fresh consumption, but also they are prepared in salads, liquor or marmalade. Leaves of this species are used in covering curanto (a traditional Chilean food).

Gunnera perpensa is a source of traditional medicine in southern Africa, both in veterinary and human ailments, largely in obstetric and digestive complaints, but also as a wound dressing. It also is eaten in various ways, largely the petioles, flower stalks and leaves, fresh and raw, preferably with skins and fibre removed, which is said to remove bitterness, but also cooked. The plant also is said to be used in making a beer.

References

External links 
 
 
 Gunneraceae  in L. Watson and M.J. Dallwitz (1992 onwards). The families of flowering plants : descriptions, illustrations, identification, information retrieval. Version: 21 May 2006. http://delta-intkey.com 
 links at CSDL
 The Gunnera Gallery
 Gunnera magellanica pictures from Chilebosque
 Global Invasive Species database Gunnera tinctoria
 Medicinal plant details Gunnera perpensa
 

 
Eudicot genera
Medicinal plants
Taxa named by Carl Linnaeus